Brančić is a village situated in Ljig municipality, Kolubara District in Serbia.

References

Populated places in Kolubara District